Steven Brian Williams (born 8 July 1970) is an English former professional footballer who played in the Football League for Chesterfield and Mansfield Town.

References

1970 births
Living people
English footballers
Association football forwards
English Football League players
Mansfield Town F.C. players
Eastwood Town F.C. players
Chesterfield F.C. players
Ilkeston Town F.C. (1945) players